Edward T. Seay (c. 1869 – August 19, 1941) was an American lawyer and a politician. He served as the speaker of the Tennessee Senate from 1901 to 1903. He represented the Louisville and Nashville Railroad, and he was the acting dean of the Vanderbilt University Law School from 1929 to 1930.

Early life
Edward T. Seay was born circa 1869 in Hartsville, Tennessee. His father, George Seay, was the chancellor of the district court of Sumner County, and Seay grew up in Gallatin. He graduated from Vanderbilt University, where he earned a bachelor of laws in 1891.

Career
Seay began practising the law with Dismukes and Seay in Gallatin in 1891. He later joined Seay, Stockwell and Edwards. In 1907, he co-founded Keeble and Seay with John Bell Keeble. It later became Keeble, Seay, Stockwell and Keeble. He was also a "special judge" on the Tennessee Supreme Court and the Tennessee Court of Appeals. He represented the Louisville and Nashville Railroad throughout his career. He was also involved the Scopes Trial.

Seay was elected to represent Sumner County in the Tennessee Senate in 1899. He served as its speaker from 1901 to 1903.

Seay began teaching at the Vanderbilt University Law School in 1907. Shortly after John Bell Keeble's death in 1929, he became the acting dean, and he was succeeded by Earl C. Arnold in 1930. He was elected to Vanderbilt University's board of trust in 1937, and also served on the board of Fisk University.

Personal life and death
Seay was married to Polly Barr, and had two daughters. He resided at 3702 Richland Avenue in Nashville. He was a member of the Vine Street Christian Church and the First Presbyterian Church. He was also a "32nd Degree Mason, a Shriner and a Knight of Pythias."

Seay died of a heart attack on August 19, 1941. He was buried in Gallatin, Tennessee.

References

1860s births
1941 deaths
People from Gallatin, Tennessee
People from Nashville, Tennessee
Vanderbilt University alumni
Vanderbilt University faculty
Tennessee state senators
Tennessee lawyers
Louisville and Nashville Railroad people
American Freemasons
People from Hartsville, Tennessee